In 2013, after the parties of the traditional red bloc had won a majority, it was expected that the Social Democrats would win the mayor's position for a second term. However Jan Reimer Christiansen from the party, suddenly switched his party affiliation to Venstre. This resulted in chain reactions that eventually led to Kenneth Muhs from Venstre becoming mayor of Nyborg Municipality.

In the 2017 election, Venstre would win an absolute majority and Kenneth Muhs could continue for a second term.

For this election, once again Venstre would win an absolute majority, and would receive more than 50% of the vote, winning a total of 14 seats. Therefore Kenneth Muhs, who stood for a third term, could once again call himself mayor.

Electoral system
For elections to Danish municipalities, a number varying from 9 to 31 are chosen to be elected to the municipal council. The seats are then allocated using the D'Hondt method and a closed list proportional representation.
Nyborg Municipality had 25 seats in 2021

Unlike in Danish General Elections, in elections to municipal councils, electoral alliances are allowed.

Electoral alliances  

Electoral Alliance 1

Electoral Alliance 2

Results

Notes

References 

Nyborg